Karen Davies (born 19 June 1965) is a professional golfer from Wales who formerly played on the LPGA Tour.

Amateur career 
Davies was born in Wrexham, Wales.  She gained her first recognition as an amateur golfer when she won the Welsh Girls Championship in 1980 and 1982. She was runner-up in the 1984 Welsh Ladies' Amateur Championship.

Davies attended the University of Florida in Gainesville, Florida, United States, where she played for coach Mimi Ryan's Florida Gators women's golf team in National Collegiate Athletic Association (NCAA) competition from 1985 to 1988.  While playing for Florida, she was the individual Southeastern Conference (SEC) champion in 1986, led her Gators team to back-to-back NCAA championships in 1985 and 1986, and set the team record for most collegiate events won with nine.  Davies was honored as the SEC Freshman of the Year in 1985, the SEC Player of the Year in 1987, and was a four-time first-team All-SEC selection (1985–1988) and a three-time first-team All-American (1986–1988).  In between college golf seasons, she played on the winning Great Britain and Ireland Curtis Cup teams in 1986 and 1988.

Davies was inducted into the University of Florida Athletic Hall of Fame as a "Gator Great" in 2000.

Professional career 
Davies qualified for the LPGA Tour in 1990.  Her best results on tour were a trio of sixth-place finishes: 1991 Ping-Cellular One LPGA Golf Championship, 1992 Itoki Hawaiian Ladies Open, and 1996 Sara Lee Classic.

Amateur wins 
1980 Welsh Girls Championship
1982 Welsh Girls Championship

Team appearances
Amateur
Curtis Cup (representing Great Britain & Ireland): 1986 (winners), 1988 (winners)
Vagliano Trophy (representing Great Britain & Ireland): 1987 (winners)
European Ladies' Team Championship (representing Wales): 1987
Commonwealth Trophy (representing Great Britain): 1987

See also 

List of Florida Gators women's golfers on the LPGA Tour
List of University of Florida alumni
List of University of Florida Athletic Hall of Fame members

References

External links 

Davies's profile on Yahoo Sports
Sports Profile

Welsh female golfers
Florida Gators women's golfers
Ladies European Tour golfers
LPGA Tour golfers
Sportspeople from Wrexham
1965 births
Living people